Oktyabr is a rural locality (a village) in Churayevsky Selsoviet, Mishkinsky District, Bashkortostan, Russia. The population was 151 as of 2010. There is 1 street.

Geography 
Oktyabr is located 44 km northwest of Mishkino (the district's administrative centre) by road. Churayevo is the nearest rural locality.

References 

Rural localities in Mishkinsky District